The Milakokia River is a  river on the Upper Peninsula of Michigan in the United States. It flows through Mackinac County and Schoolcraft County before emptying into Lake Michigan near Port Inland. The source of the river is Milakokia Lake.

See also
List of rivers of Michigan

References

Michigan  Streamflow Data from the USGS

Rivers of Michigan
Tributaries of Lake Michigan